Shontelligence is the debut studio album of Barbadian R&B/pop singer Shontelle. It was released on November 18, 2008. However, due to low sales, the album was re-released, featuring the new single "Stuck With Each Other", on March 10, 2009.

Background
Speaking to noted UK R&B writer Pete Lewis of the award-winning 'Blues & Soul' in February 2009, Shontelle described how the album title first came about: "We were actually hanging out in the studio, kinda waiting for things to bubble up - you know, the guys there tend to get a bit silly sometimes with their sense of humour. So one guy somehow comes up with this bright idea - 'Hey Shontelle! Let's play a word-game with your name today! Whoever can come up with the most words using your name gets free lunch!'! So they're like 'Shontel-evator', 'Shontel-evision', 'Shontel-icopter'... Then my engineer, Al, suddenly turns round and says 'Yeah, that's some real Shontelligence there!'... And straightaway everyone in the studio turned around at the same time, and were like 'That has to be your album title!'!"

Reception

Critical

The album has received generally mixed reviews from music critics.

Ben Ratliffe of The New York Times gave the album a mixed review stating that:
Any pop singer who's been through that mill, willingly or not, has something to tell, but it feels as if Shontelle's individuality is being squelched. The first two tracks, T-Shirt and Battle Cry, both produced by Wayne Wilkins, are the singles, and they stand apart from the rest of the album. They're rampagingly sweet R&B songs, one about the solidarity of lust, one about the solidarity of friendship. After that -- largely in songs produced by Mr. Sturken and Mr. Rogers -- things go sharply downhill. There are enough acoustic guitar and reggae grooves to distinguish Shontelligence from most R&B records, but it hardly matters; this is a record in which a song called Ghetto Lullabye, inevitably rhymes its title with the line hush now, shorty, don't you cry. A potential identity for Shontelle almost rises up in Plastic People, about political conformity, but it's for naught: redolent of Des'ree's You Gotta Be, the song is already drowning in sonic conformity.

Alex Macpherson of The Guardian gave the album a mixed 3/5 stars, citing the artist's "thoughtful songwriting and an understated vocal presence". The Guardian'''s Paul Lester was more negative, saying the album's lead single was horrible and that he preferred Rihanna to Shontelle, and labeled her a "wannabe hitmaker", citing "the bland lyrics" of "T-Shirt" being comparable to any R&B song. Both reviewers compared Shontelle to Ne-Yo.

David Balls of Digital Spy gave the album a mixed 3/5 stars:
Crafted by a team of established hitmakers including Stargate and Evan Rogers and Carl Sturken, Shontelligence certainly has the potential to shift units in an age of disposable R&B. But considering Shontelle's high-achieving past, it's disappointing that the handful of shining moments are dimmed by a barrage of mediocrity. Still, with her strong ambition and clear determination to succeed, you wouldn't bet against her best being yet to come.

Singles
 "T-Shirt" was released as the first single from the album on July 15, 2008. It peaked at number thirty-six on the Billboard Hot 100 in the US, giving Shontelle her first Top 40 hit. The song was released in the UK on February 23, 2009. The song was most successful there because it reached number six on the UK chart. It was also A-listed on Radio 1's playlist and received strong rotation on music channels. The song peaked inside the Top 50 in Canada and Ireland as well.
 "Stuck with Each Other" (featuring Akon) was released as the second single from the album on February 10, 2009. The song was a bonus track from the re-release of the album and it was also featured on the film Confessions of a Shopaholic'''s soundtrack, from which it was released as a promotional single from. It was released only in the form of a digital download in the UK on May 25, 2009 but still managed to reach number twenty-three there. The single also peaked at number fifty in Ireland and number sixty-four on the US Billboard Pop 100 despite receiving no promotion and minimal airplay. The single failed to chart on the US Hot 100, however.
 "Battle Cry" was released as the third and final single from the album on June 9, 2009. It was released as a promo single on October 21, 2008 in support of the Barack Obama compilation album. The song failed to chart in the US. "Battle Cry" was also released in the UK as the third single on August 10, 2009 and reached a peak of number sixty-one there, without promotion.

Other Notable Songs
 "Roll It" was a song written by Sheldon Benjamin and Shontelle for Alison Hinds, and was originally titled "Roll It Gal". It became a huge hit in many Caribbean countries. The song was later re-released in certain areas of Europe under the new title "Roll It" and was performed by J-Status and Rihanna with backing vocals from Shontelle. It was most successful in Finland, reaching number 8 on their chart. Shontelle included the song on her debut album with vocals sang solely by her.
 "Superwoman" was announced as the fourth single in the United States, due for a September 2009 release, but Shontelle stated that it would not be released as a single.

Track listing

  At a certain point in 2009, most reprints of the album were released with Stuck with Each Other on the track list at number 2 and further included the track Naughty in all areas at track 10, deprecating I Crave You from appearing on the tracklist. This edition retains Blaze It Up as an iTunes exclusive track. I Crave You, Blaze It Up and the Bimbo Jones vocal remix of T-Shirt later appeared as bonus tracks on the 2009 Japan edition of the album, the first release in the territory.

Charts

References

External links
 Official website

2008 debut albums
Albums produced by Carl Sturken and Evan Rogers
Albums produced by Stargate
Shontelle albums